Enis Imamović is a Serbian politician from the country's Bosniak community. He has served in the National Assembly of Serbia since 2012 as a member of the Party of Democratic Action of Sandžak (Stranka demokratske akcije Sandžaka, SDA).

Early life and private career
Imamović was born in Novi Pazar, in the Sandžak region of what was then the Socialist Republic of Serbia in the Socialist Federal Republic of Yugoslavia. He has a degree in biochemistry from the State University of Novi Pazar and is a professor of the subject. He was also a professional volleyball player from 1999 to 2008.

Politician
Imamović joined the SDA's youth wing in 2003. In 2008, he was elected as a SDA vice-president and appointed as a party spokesperson.

In January 2009, he charged that a mob encouraged by rival parties sought to assassinate SDA leader Sulejman Ugljanin during a confrontation at the headquarters of the Bosniak List for a European Sandžak, a political alliance headed by the SDA. The Sandžak Democratic Party, the SDA's principal rival, rejected the assertion that anyone sought to harm Ugljanin, let alone assassinate him. In 2015, Imamović accused local authorities of witness intimidation and other abuses of power pertaining to the incident.

Parliamentarian

2012–2016
Imamović received the third position on the SDA's electoral list in the 2012 Serbian parliamentary election. The party won two mandates; Imamović was not immediately elected but was awarded a seat on 25 July 2012 as a replacement for Ifeta Radončić, who resigned on the same day that the assembly convened. The SDA initially served in an assembly group with the People's Party (Narodna partija, NP); Maja Gojković was the group's leader, and Imamović was her deputy. This arrangement did not last, and SDA deputies afterward served on their own. In this sitting of parliament, Imamović was a member of the parliamentary friendship groups with Azerbaijan, Bosnia and Herzegovina, France, Germany, Turkey, United Kingdom, and the United States of America. The SDA was part of the government during this time, and Imamović served as an administration supporter.

Imamović was promoted to the second position on the SDA's list for the 2014 parliamentary election and was re-elected when the party won three seats. After the election, the SDA left the government and moved into opposition; the party formed an assembly group with the Liberal Democratic Party (Liberalno demokratska partija, LDP). In his second term, Imamović was a member of the committee for the economy, regional development, trade, tourism, and energy; a deputy member of the committee for labour, social affairs, social inclusion, and poverty reduction; a deputy member of Serbia's delegation to the Parliamentary Assembly of the Mediterranean; and a member of the friendship groups with Algeria, Austria, Azerbaijan, Bosnia and Herzegovina, China, Croatia, the Czech Republic, France, Germany, India, Indonesia, Iran, Kuwait, Lebanon, Luxembourg, the Republic of Macedonia, Montenegro, Morocco, Russia, Saudi Arabia, Slovakia, Slovenia, Tunisia, Turkey, the United Kingdom, and the United States of America. In 2014, he proposed a type of autonomy for the Sandžak similar to that of South Tyrol within Italy.

2016–22
Imamović again received the second position on the SDA's list in the 2016 parliamentary election and was elected for a third term when the party won two seats. The SDA again sat in an assembly group with the LDP, and Imamović became the group's deputy leader. In this parliament, he was a member of the committee on human and minority rights and gender equality; a member of the committee on labour, social issues, social inclusion, and poverty reduction; a deputy member of the committee for culture and information and the committee on the rights of the child; a member of a working group for the rights of minorities; a member of Serbia's delegation to the Parliamentary Assembly of the Mediterranean; and a deputy member of its delegation to the parliamentary dimension of the Central European Initiative.

Imamović was promoted to the lead position on the SDA's list in the 2020 Serbian parliamentary election and was elected to a fourth term when the party won three mandates. The SDA formed an assembly group after the election with members of the Albanian Democratic Alternative coalition led by the Party for Democratic Action (Partija za demokratsko delovanje, PDD), and Imamović again served in the role of deputy leader. He was a member of the committee for European integration; a deputy member of the labour committee; the president of Serbia's parliamentary friendship group with Luxembourg; and a member of the friendship groups with Albania, Algeria, Austria, Azerbaijan, Belgium, Bosnia and Herzegovina, Canada, Croatia, France, Germany, Indonesia, Montenegro, Norway, Palestine, Portugal, Slovenia, Sweden, Switzerland, Turkey, the United Kingdom, and the United States of America.

He was also appointed as a member of Serbia's delegation to the Parliamentary Assembly of the Council of Europe (PACE) on 25 January 2021. In the PACE, he was a full member of the committee on social affairs, health, and sustainable development; and a full member of the committee on migration, refugees, and displaced persons. He did not serve with any parliamentary group.

At the municipal level, Imamović received the first position on the SDA's list for the Novi Pazar city assembly in the 2016 Serbian local elections and was elected when the list won eleven mandates. He resigned his seat on 27 June 2016. He appeared in the second position on the party's list for the 2020 local elections and was again elected when the list won nine seats. He again resigned on 6 August 2021.

2022 election and after
Imamović again appeared in the lead position on the SDA's list in the 2022 Serbian parliamentary election and was re-elected when the list won two seats. Following the election, the SDA was initially a part of an assembly group called European Regions, which also included delegates from Vojvodina and from Serbia's Albanian community; Imamović was the group's deputy leader. The group ceased to exist when one of its members, Tomislav Žigmanov, was appointed as a minister in the Serbian government.

Imamović is currently a member of the environmental protection committee and the health and family committee, and a member of Serbia's delegation to the South-East European Cooperation Process parliamentary assembly. His term in the PACE ended on 9 October 2022. 

Since 2014, Imamović has been a member of the opposition in the Serbian assembly.

References

1984 births
Living people
Politicians from Novi Pazar
Members of the National Assembly (Serbia)
Party of Democratic Action of Sandžak politicians
Members of the Parliamentary Assembly of the Council of Europe
Members of the Parliamentary Assembly of the Mediterranean
Members of the South-East European Cooperation Process Parliamentary Assembly
Substitute members of the Parliamentary Dimension of the Central European Initiative